(), also known as , or , or , is one type of two-piece ceremonial traditional Chinese wedding set of attire, which is composed of a jacket called  and of a long Chinese skirt called . The  is a type of Hanfu worn by Han Chinese brides and originated in the 18th century during the Qing dynasty. It eventually became the traditional wedding attire of Cantonese brides in the Guangdong regions. It is traditionally handmade and is decorated with dragons and phoenixes embroideries.

Origins and tradition 

The wedding dress worn in Ming dynasty continued to influence the wedding dress of the later centuries.

What is known as  only started to be worn in the 18th century during the Qing dynasty. The originated in Guangdong when Liang Zhu, a Guangdong Qing dynasty politician, was rewarded with a silk wedding dress embroidered with dragons and phoenixes by the Qing Emperor at the time of his daughter's wedding. This led to the use  in the Guangdong area.

The  would then be placed as a part of the daughter's bride dowry when she gets married.

Construction and Design 
The skirt could be pleated.

Colour 
While Western wedding dress tends to be white in colour, Chinese traditional wedding clothing favours the use of red and gold colour.

The  was originally black in colour while the skirt was originally red in colour.

The  which is completely red in colour only appeared in the 1960s. Since then the traditional black  and red  started to be used for the bride's mother instead of being worn by the brides themselves.

Embroidery 

The  is typically embroidered with the Chinese dragons called  and the Chinese phoenix  called . It can also be decorated with other auspicious symbols, such as pomegranate (symbolism for fertility), peony flowers, lotus flowers, bats, goldfish, butterfly and birds.

 : 30% covered with embroidery,
 : 50% covered with embroidery
 : 70% covered with embroidery
 : 90% covered with embroidery
 : 100% covered with embroidery

Derivatives and influences

Betawi Bridal dress 
The Betawi bridal dress, partly influenced by Chinese culture and by Indonesian culture, looks similar to the Chinese . The tuaki is decorated with Chinese auspicious symbols. The Betawi lotus was used to denote the origins of the Betawi bride, but it was eventually replaced by beads which typically follows the Spanish cherry floral pattern. The kun and tuaki must match in colour.

Differences with other garments

Fengguan xiapei 

Xiuhefu 
The  is distinct from another Chinese wedding set of attire called . The  typically has an overlapping jacket which closes to the right side (instead of the  central closing jacket) which is worn with an A-line skirt which looks similar to a  instead of a straight cut skirt. The  is typically embroidered with flowers and birds to symbolize love for whole seasons.

Cheongsam 

The  is different from the cheongsam which can also be worn as a Traditional Chinese wedding dress. The  is a two-piece garment  composed of jacket and skirts while the modern cheongsam is currently a one-piece robe. Prior to the 1930s and the 1940s, the cheongsam was also a two-piece set of garment which was composed of a long robe and was worn with a pair of trousers.

See also 

 Traditional Chinese wedding dress
 Fengguan
Hanfu
 Ruqun
 Traditional Chinese marriage

References 

Chinese traditional clothing
Marriage in Chinese culture
Wedding dresses
Embroidery